Lila Lee (born Augusta Wilhelmena Fredericka Appel; July 25, 1905 – November 13, 1973) was a prominent screen actress, primarily a leading lady, of the silent film and early sound film eras.

Early life 
The daughter of Augusta Fredericka Appel and Carl Appel, Lee was born Augusta Wilhelmena Fredericka Appel on July 25, 1905, in Union Hill, New Jersey (now part of Union City), into a middle-class family of German immigrants who relocated to New York City. She had an older sister, Pauline ("Peggy"), who was born in Hamburg, Germany.

Searching for a hobby for their gregarious young daughter, the Appels enrolled Lila in Gus Edwards' kiddie review shows where she was given the nickname of  "Cuddles"; a name that she would be known by for the rest of her acting career. Her stagework became so popular with the public that her parents had her educated with private tutors. Edwards would become Lee's long-term manager.

Lillian Edwards, wife of Gus Edwards, was Lee's guardian. When Lee was 15 years old, she went to court seeking an injunction to prevent Mrs. Edwards "from collecting any money for Lila's services." Mrs. Edwards countered that she had spent 10 years helping to shape Lee's career and had invested money in her.

Career 

Lee performed in vaudeville for eight years. In 1918, she was chosen for a film contract by Hollywood film mogul Jesse Lasky for Famous Players-Lasky Corporation, which later became Paramount Pictures. Her first feature The Cruise of the Make-Believes garnered the thirteen-year-old starlet much public acclaim and Lasky quickly sent Lee on an arduous publicity campaign. Critics lauded Lila for her wholesome persona and sympathetic character parts. Lee quickly rose to the ranks of leading lady and often starred opposite such matinee heavies as Conrad Nagel, Gloria Swanson, Wallace Reid, Roscoe 'Fatty' Arbuckle, and Rudolph Valentino. Lee bore more than a slight resemblance to Ann Little, a former Paramount star and frequent Reid co-star who was leaving the film business and at this stage in her career an even stronger resemblance to Marguerite Clark.

In 1922, Lee was cast as Carmen in the enormously popular film Blood and Sand, opposite matinee idol Rudolph Valentino and silent screen vamp Nita Naldi; Lee subsequently won the first WAMPAS Baby Stars award that year. Lee continued to be a highly popular leading lady throughout the 1920s and made scores of critically praised and widely watched films.

As the Roaring Twenties drew to a close, Lee's popularity began to wane and Lee positioned herself for the transition to talkies. She is one of the few leading ladies of the silent screen whose popularity did not nosedive with the coming of sound. She went back to working with the major studios and appeared, most notably, in The Unholy Three, in 1930, opposite Lon Chaney Sr. in his only talkie. However, a series of bad career choices and bouts of recurring tuberculosis and alcoholism hindered further projects and Lee was relegated to taking parts in mostly grade B-movies.

After the Reid Russell scandal in 1936, Lee's career was completely over. She would not act in another film until 1967's Cottonpickin' Chickenpickers, which was also her final film.

Personal life 
Lee was married and divorced three times. Her first husband, almost 30 years her senior, was actor James Kirkwood, Sr., whom she married on July 26, 1923. They had met on the set of Ebb Tide in 1922. Kirkwood filed for divorce in May 1930 on grounds of her desertion; the divorce was finalized in August 1931. Lee and Kirkwood had a son in 1924, James Kirkwood, Jr. ("Jimmy"), whose custody was granted to his father; he became a highly regarded playwright and screenwriter whose works include A Chorus Line and P.S. Your Cat Is Dead. Kirkwood Jr. was primarily raised by Lee's family in Elyria, Ohio.

In her autobiography, Lee revealed she lost her virginity to Kirkwood before they were married and she fell pregnant as a result. Kirkwood ultimately arranged an abortion for her, and their relationship continued after this only because Kirkwood threatened to tell Lee's mother of their premarital relations.

In June 1928, Lee began an affair with John Farrow while Kirkwood was in London. Lee wrote Kirkwood stating she wanted a divorce, and in late September of that year, the two formally separated. Lee decided not to fight for custody of their son because Kirkwood threatened to kill Farrow, Lee, their son, and himself. After their divorce, Lee traveled to Arizona and stayed in a sanitarium. Lee also became engaged to John Farrow, but they separated in 1933 after Lee discovered he was being unfaithful to her. He would go on to marry Maureen O'Sullivan in 1936.

At the beginning of her career, Lee dated Charlie Chaplin. Leatrice Joy claimed Lee had an affair with John Gilbert while they were married.

Her second husband was broker Jack R. Peine, who she married on December 8, 1934. In August 1934, Lee, Peine, and chauffeur George Morrison had been sued for $110,000 by Italian opera singer and voice teacher Emilio Staine, who claimed he had been struck by their car when crossing a street in Santa Monica, California.  By July 2, 1935, the two had divorced. Lee claimed Peine was a drunk, a gambler, and a cheater. Shortly into their marriage, with Lee looking for a house for the two, Peine took off to Mexico and didn't return for a month.

In 1935, Lee began a relationship with car salesman Reid Russell. In 1936, Lee was living in California with her son James Jr, novelist Gouverneur Morris, and his wife Ruth. Lee became engaged to Russell and planned to marry him once he obtained a divorce. On September 25, 1936, Russell's dead body was discovered outside on the hammock by Kirkwood Jr., and a scandal that would ultimately end Lee's career ensued.

Her third husband was broker John E. Murphy. According to author Sean Egan in the James Kirkwood biography Ponies & Rainbows (2011), Murphy's will left Lee at the financial mercy of his second wife, who consequently became the manipulative character Aunt Claire in P.S. Your Cat Is Dead, written by Lee's son, James Kirkwood, Jr.

Reid Russell Scandal 
Lila Lee began a relationship with car salesman Reid Russell in 1935. On September 25, 1936, Reid Russell's dead body was discovered outside on the hammock by Kirkwood Jr. (Ruth Morris would later claim it was she who discovered Russell's body). He had been shot in the head with a .32 caliber one or two days prior. The bullet had penetrated Russell's head and passed through; neither it nor its empty shell were ever found. The gun found in his hand was one he kept in his bureau drawer at home.

Following the discovery of Russell's body, his death was investigated and treated as a suicide, and Mr. and Mrs. Morris both said that he was suicidal and had made suicidal remarks after losing his job. Lee would later confirm he had threatened suicide on multiple occasions and that he talked about it incessantly.

On November 11, the Los Angeles Times reported that a woman had made a telephone threat towards Russell's mother, Victoria, urging her to stop pushing the investigation into her son's death. The case had recently been reopened after Victoria had a conference with the investigators. 

Ruth told Lila that Reid had left a suicide note, but that she wasn't going to tell anyone about it. Lee went to the District Attorney's office to say that there was no suicide note; however, Morris backtracked and said that there was. Lee herself never read the note, but Morris read it to her and then burned it in an ashtray. Later in life, James Kirkwood Jr. would confide to a friend, William Russo, that there had been three suicide notes – one in Ruth Morris' jewel box and two within a newel post on the handrail of a set of stairs in the house. The two other notes were found after the case was closed.

Gouverneur Morris, his wife Ruth, and Lila Lee were questioned by authorities about the destruction of the suicide note. Mrs. Morris claimed she found the suicide note in a box on her dresser drawer two or three days after Russell's body was discovered. Because his death had already been declared a suicide, Morris decided to burn it. Gouverneur Morris added that neither he nor his wife heard the report of a gunshot neighbors recalled coming from the Morris home at about 9 P.M. on September 24, and that there had been no argument prior to Russell's death.

On November 17, the Los Angeles Times reported that Russell's body may be exhumed depending on the report of a ballistic expert who was trying to determine if the .32 caliber revolver found in his hand had been fired recently. The following day, it was reported that the exhumation would go ahead (as it could not be determined if the rusty gun had been fired recently). During this time, investigators began to doubt the suicide hypothesis, but still were not considering murder; rather, they questioned whether his death had occurred somewhere other than the outside hammock. Also on the 18th, the San Francisco Chronicle reported that Russell's mother Victoria claimed that four days before Russell's body was found, a woman had telephoned repeatedly asking for Russell and demanding to know where he was. Investigators were beginning to consider a "love slaying" theory. However, on November 19, his ex-wife told the Los Angeles Times that she believed Russell had killed himself. An entirely new theory was also introduced that day by The Examiner, which ran a story headed "Racketeering Ring Linked to Russell Case." The source for the information was Detective Lieutenant Harry Leslie Hansen of the Georgia Street Division, who was an old friend of Russell. The Los Angeles Times on the 20th reported that Hansen had told the District Attorney's office that Russell had said he was going to quit his automobile salesman's job to smuggle arms and ammunition to a foreign country (and that Russell had told Hansen this when the two had gone on a weekend party five days before his death). The same paper reported that a county autopsy on Russell's corpse confirmed the first autopsy's findings: the wound on Russell's temple was powder-marked and seared, indicating a self-inflicted wound and that the wound was too small to have been made by either .45 or .38 caliber weapons and too big for a .22, thus indicating that the .32 found in Russell's hand was indeed the cause of death.

On November 21, it was reported Russell's financial affairs were being looked into and that other authorities were beginning a search of automobiles used by Russell and a number of his friends for blood stains. The next day, the paper announced that the clothes Russell had been wearing when he died had been retrieved from his undertaker and that an important announcement may be made as a result of examining it. No such announcement was made, however, and on the 24th Gouverneur Morris said to the Times and the Chronicle that the entire investigation was ridiculous and foolish and that, "No matter how much they investigate they'll learn one thing – that is that the unfortunate young man killed himself. We have given officers the names of five people to whom Russell had declared he intended to commit suicide. I'm sick and tired of being hauled out of bed at all hours to answer questions I've already answered and if this thing continues I'll take legal action to stop the District Attorney's office from making a public show of me."

The 25th saw the Times carry a story titled "New Mystery Angles Enter Russell Death Case"; however, the article gave out very little information aside from the fact that law enforcement was looking at the status of Russell's bank account and the reason for his termination from his job. In addition, the gun was due to undergo tests to find out the atmospheric conditions to which it had been subjected.

On December 12, 1936, DA Buron Fitts closed the case on the grounds that "blood tests" had ruled out foul play. Fitts had been accused of accepting movie studio payoffs. Before the Reid Russell case, he had helped cover up the reasons for the death of Paul Bern, had allegedly been involved in dropping a statutory rape charge against a wealthy man (involving bribery), and had closed the murder case of William Desmond Taylor in 1922.

In the aftermath of the investigation, Gouverneur Morris got into a car accident (although he recovered and lived until 1953). Ruth Morris committed suicide in 1939.

In her autobiography,  Lila Lee wrote, "They started digging around the place and they had found that our gardener had had relations with a sheep, had buried it. It was too silly to make the papers. The gardener had made a pass at Jimmy when he was alone in the house in the afternoon. He was gotten rid of but fast." She further wrote, "I think he [Reid Russell] committed suicide." However, Evan Rhodes wrote in his handwritten notes that Lee had said to him, "Do you want to know about the killing?...not the killing – the suicide."

Health 
In the 1930s, Lee was diagnosed with tuberculosis and briefly stayed at a sanitarium in Prescott, Arizona in 1933. She then moved to Saranac Lake, New York for treatment at the Will Rogers Memorial Hospital. Lee made several uneventful appearances in stage plays in the 1940s and starred in early television soap operas in the 1950s.

Death 
In 1973 Lee died of a stroke at Saranac Lake. She is buried at Brookdale Cemetery in Elyria, Ohio.

Recognition 
For her contribution as an actress in motion pictures, she was awarded a star on the Hollywood Walk of Fame at 1716 Vine Street. It was dedicated on February 8, 1960.

Selected filmography 

 The Cruise of the Make-Believes (1918) as Bessie Meggison
 Such a Little Pirate (1918) as Patricia Wolf
 Jane Goes A-Wooing (1919)
 The Secret Garden (1919) as Mary Lennox
 Puppy Love (1919) as Gloria O'Connell
 Rustling a Bride (1919) as Emily
 A Daughter of the Wolf (1919) as Annette Ainsworth
 Rose o' the River (1919, unknown/presumably lost) as Rose Wiley
 The Heart of Youth (1919) as Josephine Darchat
 The Lottery Man (1919, lost film) as Polly
 Hawthorne of the U.S.A. (1919) as Princess Irma
 Male and Female (1919) as Tweeny – the Scullery Maid
 Terror Island (1920, incomplete, two reels missing) as Beverly West
 The Soul of Youth (1920, extant; Library of Congress; on DVD) as Vera Hamilton
 The Prince Chap (1920, unknown/presumably lost) as Claudia (age 18)
 Midsummer Madness (1921) as Daisy Osborne
 The Charm School (1921, lost film) as Elsie
 The Easy Road (1921, lost film) as Ella Klotz
 The Dollar-a-Year Man (1921) as Peggy Bruce
 Gasoline Gus (1921) as Sal Jo Banty
 Crazy to Marry (1921) as Annabelle Landis
 After the Show (1921, unknown/presumably lost) as Eileen
 Rent Free (1922, lost film) as Barbara Teller
 One Glorious Day (1922, lost film) as Molly McIntyre
 Is Matrimony a Failure? (1922, unknown/presumably lost) as Margaret Saxby
 The Fast Freight (1922, lost film) as Elsie
 The Dictator (1922, lost film) as Juanita
 Blood and Sand (1922) as Carmen
 The Ghost Breaker (1922, lost film) as Maria Theresa, a Spanish Heiress
 Ebb Tide (1922, lost film) as Ruth Attwater
 Back Home and Broke (1922) as Mary Thorne
 A Trip to Paramountown (1922, Documentary short) as herself
 The Ne'er-Do-Well (1923, lost film) as Chiquita
 Homeward Bound (1923, lost film) as Mary Brent
 Hollywood (1923, lost film) as Herself (cameo)
 Woman-Proof (1923, lost film) as Louise Halliday
 Love's Whirlpool (1924) as Molly
 Wandering Husbands (1924) as Diana Moreland
 Another Man's Wife (1924) as Helen Brand
 The Midnight Girl (1925) as Anna
 Coming Through (1925, lost film) as Alice Rand
 Old Home Week (1925, lost film) as Ethel Harmon
 Broken Hearts (1926, held by Library of Congress) as Ruth Esterin
 The New Klondike (1926, incomplete, one reel is missing) as Evelyn Lane
 Fascinating Youth (1926, lost, only the trailer survives) as Lila Lee
 One Increasing Purpose (1927) as Elizabeth Glade
 Million Dollar Mystery (1927) as Florence Grey
 Top Sergeant Mulligan (1928) as The girl
 The Man in Hobbles (1928, Library of Congress) as Ann Harris
 You Can't Beat the Law (1928) as Patricia Berry
 A Bit of Heaven (1928) as Fola Dale
 Thundergod (1928, held at Library of Congress) as Enid Bryant
 United States Smith (1928, BFI National Film & TV) as Molly Malone
 The Adorable Cheat (1928, held at Library of Congress) as Marion Dorsey
 Just Married (1928) as Victoire
 Black Butterflies (1928) as Norma davis
 The Little Wild Girl (1928) as Marie Cleste
 The Black Pearl (1928) as Eugenie Bromley
 Queen of the Night Clubs (1929, lost, only the trailer exists) as Bea Walters
 Honky Tonk (1929) as Beth Leonard
 Drag (1929) as Dot
 Dark Streets (1929, lost film) as Katie Dean
 The Argyle Case (1929) as Mary Morgan
 Flight (1929) as Elinor Baring
 Love, Live and Laugh (1929) as Margharita
 Show of Shows (1929, black and white version exists, technicolor version is lost) as Performer in 'What Became of the Floradora Boys' Number
 The Sacred Flame (1929, lost film) as Stella Taylor
 Second Wife (1930, held at Library of Congress) as Florence Wendell Fairchild
 Murder Will Out (1930, lost film, soundtrack may exist) as Jeanne Baldwin
 Those Who Dance (1930, held at Library of Congress) as Nora Brady
 Double Cross Roads (1930) as Mary Carlyle
 The Unholy Three (1930) as Rosie
 The Gorilla (1930, lost, soundtrack may exist) as Alice Denby
 Woman Hungry (1931) as Judith Temple
 Misbehaving Ladies (1931, held at Library of Congress) as Princess Ellen
 Unholy Love (1932) as Jane Bradford
 Radio Patrol (1932) as Sue Kennedy
 War Correspondent (1932) as Julie March
 Exposure (1932) as Doris Corbin
 The Night of June 13 (1932) as Trudie Morrow
 False Faces (1932) as Georgia Rand
 Officer Thirteen (1932) as Doris Dane
 Face in the Sky (1933) as Sharon Hadley
 The Iron Master (1933) as Janet Stillman
 The Intruder (1932) as Connie Wayne
 Lone Cowboy (1933) as Eleanor Jones
 Whirlpool (1934) as Helen Rankin Morrison
 Stand Up and Cheer! (1934) as Zelda (uncredited)
 In Love with Life (1934) as Sharon
 I Can't Escape (1934) as Mae Nichols
 The Marriage Bargain (1935) as Helen Stanhope
 The People's Enemy (1935) as Catherine Carr
 Champagne for Breakfast (1935) as Natalie Morton
 The Ex-Mrs. Bradford (1936) as Miss Prentiss, Bradford's Receptionist
 Country Gentlemen (1936) as Mrs. Louise Heath
 Two Wise Maids (1937) as Ethel Harriman
 Nation Aflame (1937) as Mona Franklin Burtis
 Oh Boy! (1938)
 Cottonpickin' Chickenpickers (1967) as Viola Zickafoose (final film role)

References

External links 

Photoplay: The Aristocrat of Motion Picture Magazines
Photoplay: The Aristocrat of Motion Picture Magazines
Lee at Golden Silents
 Virtual Film History
Houdini's leading ladies: Lila Lee at Wild About Harry
 Kirkwood and Lee with their baby 1924

1905 births
1973 deaths
American film actresses
American silent film actresses
American child actresses
American people of German descent
People from Union City, New Jersey
Vaudeville performers
20th-century American actresses
Paramount Pictures contract players
Warner Bros. contract players